Fireproof is the fifth and last studio album by Irish rock band That Petrol Emotion, released in 1993.

Critical reception
MusicHound Rock: The Essential Album Guide listed Fireproof among the band's best work, writing that "Steve Mack's tart, cynical voice is the perfect vehicle for the razor-sharp lyrics." Trouser Press wrote that "the droney, melody-deprived rockers can’t get by strictly on drive, and the album’s parallel attempt to advance the quintet’s Beatlesque pop aspirations is also stymied." Billboard praised the "bruising guitar-driven sound that always stays within the white lines of melody."

Track listing

Personnel
That Petrol Emotion
 Steve Mack –  vocals
 Damian O'Neill –  guitar
 Raymond O'Gorman –  guitar
 Brendan Kelly –  bass
 Ciaran McLaughlin –  drums
with:
 Neil Herd –  pedal steel
Paul Brewer – engineer (initial tracking)

References

External links 

 

1993 albums
That Petrol Emotion albums